Katha Nayagan ( Lead Hero) is a 2017 Indian Tamil-language romantic comedy film written and directed by Tha. Muruganantham. Produced by Vishnu Vishal, the film also stars him alongside Catherine Tresa, Anandaraj, and Soori. Featuring music composed by Sean Roldan, the venture began production in September 2016. The film was released on 8 September 2017 and received negative reviews from the film critics and audience.

Plot 
A revenue inspector falls in love with a girl but faces problems due to his cowardliness. He is compelled to find a way to prove himself to her father, who wants her to marry a brave man.

Cast

 Vishnu Vishal as Thambidurai
 Catherine Tresa as Kanmani
 Anandaraj as Dubai Sheikh Kaaja Bhai
 Soori as Annadurai
 Jeeva Ravi as Subhash Chandran, Thambidurai's father
 Saranya Ponvannan as Thambidurai's mother
 K. Natraj as Subramani, Kanmani's father
 Meera Krishnan as Padma, Kanmani's mother
 Aruldoss as Doss
 Motta Rajendran as Mike Maari (Orchestra singer)
 "Angadi Theru" Sindhu as Annadurai's wife
 Siddharth Vipin as Doctor
 Manobala as Swamy
 Swaminathan as Mani
 Sri Durga as Durga, Thambidurai's sister
 Supergood Subramani as Maths Teacher
 Boxer Arumugam as Singam
 Kovai Babu as Saravanan
 Jeyaraj as Saravanan's father
 Dakshayini as Saravanan's mother
 Maayi Sundar as Kaaja Bhai's assistant
 Dr. Arun Chinniah
 Vijay Sethupathi as Dr. Phoenix Raj (in a special appearance)
 Athulya Ravi as Kanmani's friend (in a special appearance)
 Tha. Muruganantham in a special appearance in song "Sunday Na Bottle Edu"
 Shobi Paulraj in a special appearance in song "Sunday Na Bottle Edu"
 M. Sherif special appearance in song "On Nenappu"

Production
Vishnu announced the film in September 2016, revealing that he would produce and star in a comedy film directed by newcomer Muruganandham. The film began later that month, with Soori also joining the cast and Sean Roldan signed on as the music composer. Actress Catherine Tresa signed the film after her other film with Vishnu, Shankar Dayal's Veera Dheera Sooran, got shelved. In early November 2016, Vishnu announced that the film would be titled Katha Nayagan. Silambarasan has given an opening voice over in the film and whereas Vijay Sethupathi has done a guest appearance.

Soundtrack
The music was composed by Sean Roldan and released by Sony Music India.

Release
The satellite rights of the film were sold to STAR Vijay. Baradwaj Rangan of Film Companion wrote "Kathanayagan, directed by Tha. Muruganantham, is full of potential running gags that aren’t allowed to… run. Everything comes and goes. Nothing sticks."

References

External links
 

2017 films
2010s Tamil-language films
2017 directorial debut films
Films shot in Chennai
Films scored by Sean Roldan
Fox Star Studios films
Indian romantic comedy films
2017 romantic comedy films